Trioceros schubotzi, the Mt. Kenya side-striped chameleon or Mt Kenya dwarf chameleon is a species of chameleon that was found on Mt. Kenya and originally regarded as a lectotype designation. Many finding on this species were conducted by Germans, so many of the manuscripts written about them are very old and not much has been researched on this particular species. The locality of this species can be confirmed to Mt. Kenya.

References 

Reptiles of Kenya
schubotzi
Lizards of Africa
Reptiles described in 1912
Taxa named by Richard Sternfeld